Leptostales phorcaria is a moth of the  family Geometridae. It is found on Puerto Rico, Hispaniola, Jamaica, the Bahamas and St. Vincent.

References

Moths described in 1858
Sterrhinae